Chiampo is a town and comune in the province of Vicenza, Veneto, Italy. It is on SP43.

It houses the 19th-century Roman Catholic church of Santa Maria Assunta e San Martino and was the birthplace of the priest-poet Giacomo Zanella.

Sources
(Google Maps)

Cities and towns in Veneto